Elaphidion scaramuzzai is a species of beetle in the family Cerambycidae. It was described by Fisher in 1951.

References

scaramuzzai
Beetles described in 1951